The Tampa Bay Buccaneers are a professional American football team based in Tampa, Florida. They are members of the Southern Division of the National Football Conference (NFC) in the National Football League (NFL). The franchise was founded as an NFL team in 1976 by Hugh Culverhouse. They lost their first 26 games and had one playoff win in its first 21 seasons before winning the Super Bowl in 2002.

There have been twelve head coaches for the Buccaneers franchise. The team has played 628 games in 40 seasons since joining the NFL. Four Buccaneers coaches, John McKay, Tony Dungy, Jon Gruden, and Bruce Arians, have taken the Buccaneers to the playoffs, with Gruden and Arians being the only two coaches to win the Super Bowl with the team, at Super Bowl XXXVII and Super Bowl LV respectively. The team's all-time leader in games coached is McKay (133) and the leader in wins is Gruden (57); Arians leads all Buccaneers coaches in winning percentage (.633). Leeman Bennett has the lowest winning percentage (.125) of all Buccaneers coaches.

Key

Coaches
Note: Statistics are accurate through the end of the 2022 NFL season.

Notes

References
General
 
 
 

Specific

 
Tampa Bay Buccaneers
Head coaches